This is a list of all of the active squadrons that exist in the United States Marine Corps, sorted by type.  Most squadrons have changed names and designations many times over the years, so they are listed by their current designation.

To see Marine Aviation units sorted by command hierarchy, see aviation combat element.

Squadron designations
The basic tactical and administrative unit of United States Marine Corps aviation is the squadron. Fixed-wing aircraft squadrons (heavier than air) and tiltrotor squadrons are denoted by the letter "V", which comes from the Spanish verb "volar" (to fly). Rotary wing (helicopter) squadrons use "H."  Marine squadrons are always noted by the second letter "M."  Squadron numbering is not linear as some were numbered in ascending order and others took numbers from the wing or the ship to which they were assigned. From 1920 to 1941, Marine flying squadrons were identified by one digit numbers.  This changed on July 1, 1941, when all existing squadrons were redesignated to a three-digit system.  The first two numbers were supposed to identify the squadrons parent group but with the rapid expansion during World War II and frequent transfer of squadrons this system fell apart.

Rotary-wing aircraft

Marine Helicopter Squadron

The squadron is responsible for the helicopter transportation of the president of the United States, vice president, Cabinet members and VIPs. In addition to its VIP transport role, it is also tasked with operational test and evaluation (OT&E) of new flight systems for Marine Corps helicopters. The squadron flies the VH-3D Sea King the VH-60N Whitehawk, and the MV-22 Osprey. These were due to be replaced by the VH-71 Kestrel, however that program was cancelled in April 2009.
Lastly, HMX-1 provides support to training at The Basic School, providing aerial insertion for various training events, as well as MAGTF Air component orientation to the student officers.

Marine Heavy Helicopter Squadrons
Heavy helicopter squadrons were first formed in 1966 when the Marine Corps began flying the heavy lift CH-53 Sea Stallion during the Vietnam War.  Each squadron is equipped with sixteen CH-53E Super Stallion helicopters. Their primary role is moving cargo and equipment with the secondary role of transferring troops ashore in an amphibious assault. The CH-53Es are the most powerful helicopter in the U.S. military inventory today. As part of the current reorganization of the Corps, HMH-462 will be decommissioned by 2030.

Marine Heavy Helicopter Training Squadron
The squadron trains newly designated (i.e., winged) Naval Aviators, conversion pilots, refresher pilots, and enlisted aircrew on the CH-53E Super Stallion.

Marine Light Attack Helicopter Squadrons
The Marine Corps’ light attack squadrons are composite squadrons made up of 18 AH-1Z Vipers and 9 UH-1Y Venoms. The primary missions of the Viper is close air support, forward air control, reconnaissance and armed escort,  while the Huey provides airborne command and control, utility support, supporting arms coordination and medical evacuation.  The H-1 upgrade program will see both the AH-1 and UH-1 get greater power, improved avionics and an 85% commonality of parts. The transition to the UH-1Y was completed in August 2014 when HMLA-773 flew the UH-1N for the last time. Due to the need for more light attack squadrons, the Marine Corps began adding new squadrons in 2008. HMLA-469 is the newest squadron. However, as part of the re-organization of the corps, HMLA-469 and HMLA-367 will be de-activated by 2030.

Marine Light Attack Helicopter Training Squadron
The squadron trains newly designated (i.e., winged) Naval Aviators, conversion pilots, refresher pilots, and enlisted aircrew on the UH-1Y Venom, and the AH-1Z Viper.

Tiltrotor Aircraft

Marine Medium Tiltrotor Squadrons

Marine tiltrotor squadrons are new units operating the MV-22 Osprey with their main mission being assault support. The Osprey offers twice the speed, five times the range, and can fly more than twice as high as the helicopters they are replacing. As the Marine Corps’ number one aviation acquisition priority, the Osprey replaced the aging fleet of CH-46 Sea Knight helicopters and is a cornerstone of the capstone concept of Expeditionary maneuver warfare.  As of October 2017, the Marine Corps has 16 Fully Operationally Capable (FOC) MV-22 squadrons. VMM-268, VMM-364, and VMM-164 reached FOC in FY16. The two newest Osprey squadrons, VMM-362 and VMM-212, will stand up in FY18 and FY19 respectively, completing the Marine Corps' transition to 18 active component MV-22 squadrons. Each squadron operates 12 aircraft.

Marine Medium Tiltrotor Training Squadron
The squadron provides new and conversion training to Marine Corps, Navy, and Air Force pilots and units in the use and maintenance of the Osprey tiltrotor aircraft.

Fixed-Wing Aircraft

Marine Attack Squadrons

Marine attack squadrons fly the AV-8B Harrier II and are tasked with providing close air support, air interdiction, surveillance and escort of helicopters.  Because the STOVL Harrier can operate from amphibious assault ships, expeditionary airfields and tactical remote landing sites, it provides commanders with more flexibility in providing air support.  The Harrier is due to be replaced by the F-35B, the STOVL version of the F-35 Lightning II. This transition began in 2016 when VMA-211 exchanged its Harriers for the F-35B and became VMFA-211.

Marine Fighter Attack Squadrons

The Marine Corps' VMFA squadrons fly the F/A-18 Hornet and F-35 Lightning II. Their primary mission is to attack and destroy surface targets, day or night, under all weather conditions; conduct multi-sensor imagery reconnaissance; provide supporting arms coordination; and intercept and destroy enemy aircraft in all weather conditions. The current F/A-18s saw their first action in Operation Desert Storm after replacing the venerable A-6 Intruder. Each Hornet squadron operates 12 aircraft and each F-35 squadron will operates 10 aircraft.

Marine Fighter Attack Training Squadrons
VMFAT-101 trains newly designated (i.e., winged) Naval Aviators to fly the F/A-18 Hornet while VMFAT-501 and 502 train new and transitioning pilots to fly the F-35B Lightning II.

Marine Fighter Training Squadron
VMFT-401 is the only aggressor squadron in the Marine Corps. It flies the F-5E Tiger II and provides instruction to active and reserve squadrons through dissimilar adversary combat tactics. The squadron is based at Marine Corps Air Station Yuma, AZ and is assigned to Marine Aircraft Group-41, 4th Marine Aircraft Wing, Marine Forces Reserve.

Marine Aerial Refueler Transport Squadrons
VMGR squadrons operate the KC-130 Hercules tanker/transport.  Their primary missions are aerial and rapid ground refuelling, transportation of personnel and cargo to include MEDEVACs and parachute insertions, flying the airborne version of the Direct Air Support Center (DASC) and emergency resupply into unimproved landing zones.

Marine Transport Squadron

VMR squadrons provide search and rescue support as well as movement of key personnel and critical logistics support around the world. They also provide movement of high priority passengers and cargo during wartime in support of operations and other critical commitments.

Marine Operational Test and Evaluation Squadron
The squadron is a Marine Corps test and development unit. Its mission is to conduct operational testing and evaluation of Marine Corps fixed, tiltrotor, and rotary-wing aircraft. The unit was redesignated to VMX-1 (from VMX-22) on May 13, 2016.

Unmanned Aerial Systems

Marine Unmanned Aerial Vehicle Squadrons
VMUs operate the RQ-21 Blackjack unmanned aerial system (UAS) which provides Marine ground forces with reconnaissance, surveillance, and target acquisition.  They also provide artillery spotting and can assist in search and rescue operations. Due to the high operational tempo of the VMU squadrons in recent years, the Marine Corps stood up VMU-3 in 2008 and VMU-4, a reserve unit, was activated in 2010 with the lineage of VMO-4.

See also

 United States Marine Corps Aviation
 Aviation combat element
 List of decommissioned United States Marine Corps aircraft squadrons
 List of United States Navy aircraft squadrons
 List of United States Marine Corps aircraft groups
 List of United States Marine Corps aircraft wings
 List of United States Marine Corps aviation support units
 List of United States Marine Corps battalions

References

Aircraft squadrons
Marine Corps aircraft squadrons